John F. Kennedy Elementary School may refer to an elementary school in one of the following districts:

 Newark Unified School District in California
 Southfield Public Schools in Michigan
 Independent School District 196 in Minnesota
 Kennedy Elementary School in Butte, Montana operated by Butte Public Schools
 Brewster Central School District in New York
 Great Neck School District in New York
 West Babylon Union Free School District in New York
 Sioux Falls School District in South Dakota
 Kingsport City Schools in Tennessee
 Grafton School District in Wisconsin

See also 
 Memorials to John F. Kennedy § Schools

Monuments and memorials to John F. Kennedy in the United States